Corky Ehlers is an American television and film editor.

He was born Donald "Corky" Ehlers, son of Evelyn Lessley, niece of Elgin Lessley, and Donald Ehlers, an assistant process camera at RKO.

He worked in Gettysburg (1993), starring Tom Berenger and Martin Sheen; The Food of the Gods (1976), directed by Bert I. Gordon and based on a novel by H. G. Wells; Tarantulas: The Deadly Cargo (1977), directed by Stuart Hagmann; Mysterious Island Of Beautiful Women (1979), directed by Joseph Pevney; and The Triangle Factory Fire Scandal (1979), directed by Mel Stuart.

Filmography

References

Bibliography

External links
 

Living people
Year of birth missing (living people)
Date of birth missing (living people)
American film editors
American television editors